Clivina pfisteri is a species of ground beetle in the subfamily Scaritinae. It was described by Andrewes in 1930.

References

pfisteri
Beetles described in 1930